The Lincoln Lawyer  is a 2011 American legal thriller film adapted from the 2005 novel of the same title by Michael Connelly. The film is directed by Brad Furman, with the screenplay written by John Romano, and stars Matthew McConaughey as the titular lawyer, Mickey Haller. The film also stars Ryan Phillippe, Marisa Tomei, Josh Lucas, William H. Macy, and Bryan Cranston.

The story is adapted from the first of several novels featuring the character of Mickey Haller, who works in a chauffeur-driven Lincoln Town Car rather than an office. Haller is hired to defend the son of a wealthy Los Angeles businesswoman in an assault case. Details of the crime bring up uncomfortable parallels with a former case, and Haller discovers the two cases are intertwined.

The film was released on March 18, 2011. It received generally positive reviews and grossed $87 million.

Plot
Criminal defense attorney Mickey Haller works in LA County, California from the back of his black Lincoln Town Car, chauffeured by Earl Briggs. He typically works for low-end criminals including Eddie Vogel, leader of a biker gang. His ex-wife, Maggie McPherson, with whom he shares a daughter, is a district attorney who disapproves of his choice of clientele.

Haller is unexpectedly hired to represent Louis Roulet, a wealthy Beverly Hills playboy and the son of real estate mogul Mary Windsor. Roulet is accused of brutally beating prostitute Regina Campo, and surprisingly, chose Haller specifically for the case. Haller and his investigator, Frank Levin, analyze photos and evidence and find similarities to a prior case where a prostitute was killed. Haller represented the defendant, Jesus Martinez, and due to the overwhelming evidence and in spite of Martinez's earnest proclamations of innocence, convinced him to plead guilty to avoid the death penalty.

Haller visits Martinez, who becomes agitated when he shows him Roulet's photo. Haller realizes that Roulet is likely the killer and that he chose Haller as counsel in order to bind Haller by attorney–client confidentiality rules and keep him from talking about either case. His own hands tied, Haller tells Levin to investigate Roulet.

Roulet breaks into Haller's house and nonchalantly admits to committing the murder for which Martinez was convicted. He also makes veiled threats towards Haller's daughter. Later, Levin is found shot dead after leaving him a voicemail message claiming he found Martinez's "ticket out of jail." Haller discovers the bullet that killed Levin matches his late father's rare .22 Colt Woodsman, which is missing from its box.

Legally obliged to defend his client, Haller ruthlessly cross-examines Campo and discredits her. He also secretly sets up a known prison informant, Dwayne Jeffrey "DJ" Corliss, to testify against Roulet with information on the previous murder. Haller is able to discredit DJ's testimony, getting Roulet's current charges dismissed. However, when Roulet is set free, the police arrest him immediately for the previous murder based on DJ's description.

Haller acquires a pistol from Earl for protection. Roulet's family gets him released due to lack of evidence and he goes to Maggie's home where he is confronted by Haller. Haller vows that he will not stop until Martinez is freed and Roulet is convicted for his crime; Roulet mockingly tells him he cannot guard his family all the time. The biker gang suddenly arrives and brutally beats Roulet.

Maggie discovers Levin had found a parking ticket issued to Roulet near the murder victim's house, strong evidence against him. Upon arriving home, Haller discovers Roulet's mother, Mary Windsor, waiting inside. She shoots him with the Colt Woodsman, confessing that she murdered Levin. When Mary moves to shoot Haller again, he draws the pistol obtained from Earl and fatally shoots her.

Martinez is released and the DA is seeking the death penalty for Roulet. As Haller and Earl drive off, he is pulled over by Vogel and the biker gang, whose case he takes pro bono in gratitude for their help.

Cast

Reception
On Rotten Tomatoes, the film holds an approval rating of 83% based on 177 reviews, with an average rating of 6.70/10. The site's critics consensus reads: "It doesn't offer any twists on the predictable courtroom thriller formula, but with a charming Matthew McConaughey leading its solid cast, The Lincoln Lawyer offers briskly enjoyable entertainment." At Metacritic, the film has an average weighted score of 63 out of 100, based on 31 critics, indicating "generally favorable reviews". Audiences polled by CinemaScore gave the film an average grade of "A−" on an A+ to F scale.

After watching a rough cut of the film on November 12, 2010, Michael Connelly, author of the book The Lincoln Lawyer, said:

Roger Ebert of the Chicago Sun-Times gave the film 3 stars out of a possible 4, saying, "The plotting seems like half-realized stabs in various directions made familiar by other crime stories. But for what it is, The Lincoln Lawyer is workmanlike, engagingly acted and entertaining."

Home media
The film was released on Blu-ray and DVD on July 12, 2011. It was later released on Ultra HD Blu-ray on August 15, 2017.

References

External links
 
 
 

2011 films
2011 drama films
2011 crime drama films
2011 crime thriller films
2011 thriller drama films
2010s English-language films
2010s legal drama films
American courtroom films
American crime thriller films
American legal drama films
American thriller drama films
Films about dysfunctional families
Films about lawyers
Films about murderers
Films about rape
Films based on American crime novels
Films directed by Brad Furman
Films produced by Sidney Kimmel
Films produced by Gary Lucchesi
Films scored by Cliff Martinez
Films set in Los Angeles
Films set in San Quentin State Prison
Films shot in Los Angeles
Lakeshore Entertainment films
Legal thriller films
Lionsgate films
Sidney Kimmel Entertainment films
2010s American films